The men's 10 metre platform, also reported as high diving, was one of four diving events on the Diving at the 1952 Summer Olympics programme.

The competition was split into two phases held on different days:

Preliminary round (31 July) – Divers performed six voluntary dives of limited degrees of difficulty. The eight divers with the highest scores advanced to the final.
Final (1 August) – Divers performed four voluntary dives without any limits of difficulty. The final score was the aggregate of the preliminary and final rounds' points.

Results

References

Sources
Diving at the 1952 Helsinki Summer Games: Men's Platform. sports-reference.com
 
 

Men
1952
Men's events at the 1952 Summer Olympics